Hashvid (also Romanized as Hashvīd and Ḩashvīd; also known as Harshvīd and HNshvīd) is a village in Pachehlak-e Gharbi Rural District, in the Central District of Azna County, Lorestan Province, Iran. At the 2006 census, its population was 287, in 66 families.

References 

Towns and villages in Azna County